The 1944–45 Nationalliga A season was the seventh season of the Nationalliga A, the top level of ice hockey in Switzerland. Seven teams participated in the league, and HC Davos won the championship.

Regular season

Relegation
 Grasshopper-Club - Young Sprinters Neuchâtel 1:7

External links
 Championnat de Suisse 1944/45

National League (ice hockey) seasons
Swiss
1944–45 in Swiss ice hockey